The Echo class is a class of multi-purpose hydrographic survey ships in commission with the Royal Navy. The ships are primarily tasked with conducting survey work in support of submarine and amphibious operations, however, the class also has a secondary role in mine countermeasures. The two vessels of the class were the most recent additions to the Royal Navy's Hydrographic Squadron. Each ship displaces approximately 3,700 tonnes, and is equipped with a state of the art suite of equipment. The lead ship of the class, HMS Echo, was retired in 2022 and her sister ship is expected to decommission in 2023.

Design
Echo and Enterprise were the first Royal Navy ships to be fitted with azimuth thrusters. Both azimuth thrusters and the bow thruster can be controlled through the integrated navigation system by a joystick providing high manoeuvrability. Complete control and monitoring for power generation and propulsion, together with all auxiliary plant systems, tank gauging and damage control functions is provided through the integrated platform management system (IPMS), accessible through workstations around the ship. The range of equipment carried includes the following:

 Multi beam echo sounder
 Single beam echo sounder
 Survey Planning and Processing Systems
 Side-scan sonar
 Oceanographic Probe and sensors
 Undulating Oceanographic Profiler
 Doppler Current Log
 Sub-bottom Profiler
 Bottom Sampling Equipment
 Survey motor boat fitted with multi-beam sonar and sidescan sonar

The vessels are armed. They carry a GAM-B01 20 mm cannon (a naval version of the Oerlikon 20 mm cannon), two miniguns and four General Purpose Machine Guns

Role
The vessels are designed to conduct survey tasks in support of submarines or amphibious operations. They can provide almost real-time tailored environmental information, and also have a secondary role as a mine countermeasure tasking authority platform, for which they are capable of embarking a dedicated mine counter measures command team, and supporting other mine warfare vessels.

Manning
This allows each ship to be available for deployment for up to 330 days a year.

The ship's crew consists of 72 personnel, with 48 on board at any one time, working a cycle of 75 days on, 30 days off. The ships are able to accommodate 81 personnel if necessary. In support of this high availability, all accommodation and recreational facilities are designed for an unusual (in a warship) degree of comfort.  All personnel share double cabins with private facilities, except the captain and executive officer who both have single cabins.

Ships in the class

Notes

References

External links

Mine warfare vessels of the United Kingdom
Auxiliary research ship classes
 
Ship classes of the Royal Navy